Ralph Edward Cindrich (born October 29, 1949) is a sports agent and former National Football League (NFL) player. A linebacker for the New England Patriots (1972), the Houston Oilers (1973, 1974, 1975), and the Denver Broncos (1974), Cindrich graduated from the University of Pittsburgh in 1972 and South Texas College of Law in 1978. 

More than three-plus decades as an NFL agent, he has represented stars such as James Farrior, Bruce Gradkowski, Tarik Glenn, Jeff Blake, Brian Griese, Al Toon, Dermontti Dawson, Will Wolford, and Scott Zolak among others. As an agent, Cindrich also negotiated one of the landmark contracts in sports history, one that forever altered the salary hierarchy in the NFL and would be prominently featured in Michael Lewis' book The Blind Side: Evolution of a Game.

High school
Cindrich was born in Washington, Pennsylvania, to Anthony and Stella Cindrich. In the fall of 1963, he attended nearby Avella High School , where he starred on the wrestling and football teams. During his junior season in 1966, Cindrich was the Pennsylvania State runner-up in the unlimited weight class and again in 1967, losing in the finals to Dave Joyner of State College, PA in overtime on a disputed grabbing the jersey calling. Cindrich wrestled two periods and overtime with two broken hand bones. In both his junior and senior seasons, Cindrich claimed the Western Pennsylvania Heavyweight Championship and went undefeated and untied in dual meets.

Cindrich was just as good, if not better, as a linebacker and center for Avella High's varsity football team. He was named All-Western Pennsylvania High School Football Selection in 1966 and 1967.  In 1967, Cindrich was chosen as Pennsylvania All-State and Most Valuable Player of Western Pennsylvania Class B Football.  That year, he also served as Captain of the state's All-Star "Big 33" team that played against a Texas All-Star football team.

College
Although he was recruited by several top college programs, Cindrich chose to stay close to his Western Pennsylvania home, opting to play football for the University of Pittsburgh.  He continued to wrestle for the Pitt Panthers, winning the NCAA Eastern Heavyweight Championship in 1969, in addition to being named an All-American and taking 4th in the NCAA Tournament.

As a linebacker for the Panthers football team, Cindrich became a starter during his sophomore year. In the team's season opener on the road against the UCLA Bruins, Cindrich burst on the scene, with 17 tackles—West Virginia Mountaineers''s Head Coach, Jim Carlens, said of Cindrich, "If there's a better sophomore linebacker in America, I'd like to see him"—but a broken ankle in that game forced him to miss the rest of the season.

After redshirting during the rest of the 1968 season, Cindrich returned as a starter in 1969. In the Panthers' second game on the road against the Oklahoma Sooners, he led the team with 21 tackles (10 solo tackles). Later that year, he was named to the All-East Team, All-Conference Team, and All-American team despite Pitt's sixth consecutive losing season. In 1970, Cindrich suffered a knee injury in the season's opener against UCLA.  It kept him out of the lineup early in the season, but he returned to help lead the team to a 5-5 record in 1970.

The injury to his knee kept Cindrich from playing spring football as a senior in 1971, but he was ready to play once the season started. In the opener, the Panthers traveled to the Rose Bowl and upset the UCLA Bruins, 29-25. Cindrich was named Lineman of the Week by the Associated Press for his eight tackles, four assists, and two fumble recoveries. Later that season, he helped secure a win over Syracuse with three of his game-high 16 tackles coming on a goal-line stand late in the Panther victory. Again Cindrich was named to the All-East Team, All-Conference Team, and Associated Press All-American team.

NFL
The Atlanta Falcons selected Cindrich with their fifth-round pick (119th overall) in the 1972 NFL Draftbut released him near the end of the preseason. A week later, New England claimed Cindrich off waivers, and he was named AP Player of the Week in a game against the eventual Super Bowl Champion Miami Dolphins.  New England cut him before the 1973 season, but he was picked up by the Houston Oilers, whom he played for during the next two seasons. After being cut by the Denver Broncos during the 1975 preseason, the Oilers resigned from Cindrich for the remainder. He retired following the 1975 season.

Law School and early agent's career
During his career with the Oilers, Cindrich began law school at nearby South Texas College of Law in Houston. He founded Cindrich & Company, a sports representation firm, in 1977 and graduated with his law degree in 1978.

His first big-name client was Mark May, an offensive tackle from Cindrich's alma mater, the University of Pittsburgh. The Washington Redskins selected May with their first-round pick (20th overall) in the 1981 NFL Draft. After arduous public negotiations that summer with the Redskins General Manager Bobby Beathard, May signed with the team in late July, putting to rest rumors that he would bolt to the Canadian Football League. Cindrich would continue to represent May, negotiating every one of his NFL contracts and deals as an announcer with Turner, CBS, and later as an ESPN College football analyst. The two remain close friends.

By the 1985 NFL Draft, Cindrich would have a significant impact.  Two of his clients, Al Toon from the University of Wisconsin and Bill Fralic from the University of Pittsburgh, were expected to be top draft picks. During ESPN's televised coverage of the draft, Mel Kiper Jr. stated:

We'll see the impact Ralph Cindrich has on this draft right away. I think Minnesota wanted (Bill) Fralic. I know you talk about Indianapolis, they would have taken Al Toon, but he (Cindrich) wrote a letter to Irsay stating that he didn't want Toon to play with the Colts. Same with Minnesota. So we'll see if those teams shy away from Fralic and Toon. We will see if Cindrich has a direct impact on the draft.

Because of the team's negotiating history, Cindrich told the press that Fralic would not want to play for Minnesota, who held the second overall pick. The Vikings traded their pick to the Atlanta Falcons for a 1st and 3rd round selection on Draft Day. The Falcons then selected Fralic, who signed the most lucrative contract for any lineman in the draft, including the top overall pick, Buffalo's Bruce Smith. The impact of Fralic's deal was long-lasting:

Fralic's contract is so lucrative that it has caused a slowdown in the next eleven picks below him in the first round of the draft. No other Number 1 has such an annuity package nor a present value this high. Defensive end Bruce Smith, the draft's No. 1 pick, signed a $2.8 million contract for the Buffalo Bills, worth $2.1 Million in present value. When Fralic signed Monday, and first reports of the numbers leaked out, agent Joe Courrege immediately upped the demand for Texas A&M defensive end Ray Childriess, the draft's No. 3 selection.

Toon also benefited from Cindrich's hard-edged negotiations in the 1985 Draft. The New York Jets selected Toon with the 10th overall pick. He held out, and still without a contract by late August, Cindrich publicly suggested that the Jets trade Toon. But by Week 2 of the regular season (and after New York lost 31-0 to the Los Angeles Raiders), Toon signed a deal worth reportedly worth $1.6 million over five years, including a signing bonus worth $475,000. The deal paid him more money than any other receiver drafted in 1985, including the San Francisco 49ers first-round selection, Jerry Rice.

Gruber and beyond
The next major contribution by Cindrich and Company came in 1988. In that year's draft, Cindrich represented Wisconsin Offensive Tackle Paul Gruber. Looking to protect their young quarterback Vinny Testaverde, the Tampa Bay Buccaneers selected Gruber with the 4th overall pick in the draft. Gruber missed four weeks of training camp but signed a five-year, $3.8 million deal with the team in early August. That month, The Sporting News declared Cindrich's negotiations "the most significant contract for any rookie this year" and "the best contract ever signed by an offensive lineman and likely will start a new salary spiral at the position." Cindrich was now widely recognized as the best agent for NFL offensive linemen.

In 1989, Cindrich helped facilitate the now-famous "Herschel Walker trade" between the Dallas Cowboys and Minnesota Vikings. As part of his new contract with the Vikings, Walker received $1.25 million in cash and other considerations (including a Mercedes-Benz automobile) and doubled his previous salary. Cindrich had now negotiated the second and third most lucrative contracts in the NFL. He also achieved considerable salary raises for Pro Bowlers John Offerdahl, linebacker for the Miami Dolphins, Buffalo Bills Shane Conlan (linebacker), Will Wolford (offensive tackle), and Kent Hull (center).

The "Free Agent Champ"
During the early 1990s, Cindrich's stable of all-star players would expand to include Pittsburgh Steelers Pro Bowl tight end Eric Green, Washington Redskins Pro Bowl wide receiver Gary Clark, Dallas Cowboys Pro Bowl center Mark Stepnoski. In May 1993, just as the NFL Free Agency boom began, USA Today called Cindrich "the undisputed free agent champ."

Multimillion-dollar contracts continued throughout the decade. Steelers perennial pro bowl center Dermontti Dawson, New York Giants, running back Rodney Hampton, quarterbacks Gus Frerotte and Jeff Blakewere just a few of Cindrich's clients. He seemed to have the market cornered at one position in particular: during the late 1990s and early 2000s, he represented a handful of the NFL's top centers: Dawson, Stepnoski, Hull, the Miami Dolphins Tim Ruddy, the Tampa Bay Buccaneers Jeff Christy, the Baltimore Ravens Mike Flynn (American football), the Indianapolis Colts Jeff Saturday, and the New Orleans Saints LeCharles Bentley.

The Blind Side
One of Cindrich's top clients was offensive tackle Will Wolford. As the 20th overall pick of the Buffalo Bills in the 1986 NFL Draft, Cindrich negotiated a deal for Wolford that paid him a salary equal to several players drafted in the top 10. In 1993, Cindrich orchestrated Wolford's free-agent signing with Indianapolis, where his contract was worth $7.65 million over three years. Wolford was now the highest-paid offensive lineman in the NFL. In 1995, Wolford signed a four-year, $10 million with the Pittsburgh Steelers when that contract expired.
Michael Lewis's book, The Blind Side. As the man who brokered the deal, Cindrich was also mentioned:

2005 and beyond
At the end of 2005 Cindrich sold his sports agency to Debartolo Sports.  He now serves as consultant to Debartolo and continues to negotiate contracts for such notable players as Eagles wide receiver Steve Smith, Cardinals running back Beanie Wells, Steelers linebacker James Farrior, and the Colts Jeff Saturday.  Cindrich is also organized developing and planning to teach a sports law class for law students, as well as a continuing legal education sports law class for lawyers; both were offered in Italy during the Summer of 2010.

Cindrich and his family lived in Mt. Lebanon, Pennsylvania for much of his post-NFL career, including from 1994 to 2007 in the former home of NHL legend Mario Lemeiux; he and his wife now live in downtown Pittsburgh.

Honors and awards
Cindrich has often been included in the upper echelon of NFL Agents according to Pro Football Weekly, USA Today, the Denver Post, the Chicago Times, and the Dallas Morning News. The Sporting News twice ranked him as one of the top 100 most powerful people in sports.

He has been inducted into the Western Pennsylvania Hall of Fame, the Italian-American Sports Hall of Fame, the Washington County Hall of Fame and the Avella High School Hall of Fame.  He was selected to the University of Pittsburgh All Time Football Team, Walk of Fame, and in was the recipient of Washington County's Distinguished Citizen Award in Football.

NFL Brawler
In 2015, Cindrich published, NFL BRAWLER, A Player-Turned-Agent's Forty Years in the Bloody Trenches of the National Football League. NFL BRAWLER takes readers behind the scenes of major NFL drafts, deals and trades providing a first hand account of his decades in the football business.  He writes about NFL personnel like Jimmy Johnson and Bill Polian, owners Art Rooney, Bob Irsay, and Jerry Jones and players such as Herschel Walker, Bill Fralic and James Farrior.  Brash and entertaining, Cindrich tells it like it is.

References

External links
 Cindrich.com
 

Living people
American football linebackers
American sports agents
Denver Broncos players
Houston Oilers players
New England Patriots players
Pittsburgh Panthers football players
South Texas College of Law alumni
Sportspeople from Mt. Lebanon, Pennsylvania
Sportspeople from Pittsburgh
People from Washington, Pennsylvania
Players of American football from Pittsburgh
American people of Croatian descent
1949 births